The Ward-Stout House is a historic house at Front and Walnut Streets in Bradford, Arkansas.  It is a -story wood-frame structure, with a gabled roof, stucco exterior, and a concrete foundation.  The main roof has a large "doghouse" dormer with three sash windows, and projects slightly over the shed roof of the front porch, which is supported by four stuccoed piers.  Both roofs have exposed rafter ends.  Built about 1932, it is a good example of late Craftsman architecture in the community.

The house was listed on the National Register of Historic Places in 1991.

See also
National Register of Historic Places listings in White County, Arkansas

References

Houses on the National Register of Historic Places in Arkansas
Houses completed in 1932
Houses in White County, Arkansas
National Register of Historic Places in White County, Arkansas
1932 establishments in Arkansas
Bungalow architecture in Arkansas
American Craftsman architecture in Arkansas